PartXplore is a proprietary computer aided design (CAD) file viewer developed by Sescoi for reading, analyzing and sharing 3D and 2D CAD files without needing the original CAD application. It was launched in 2008 and is supported from local Vero offices. A viewer and an evaluation version are offered as freeware.

Functionality 
PartXplore is a collaborative viewer for 2D and 3D CAD files.

PartXplore enables the user to measure 3D parts and has analysis features allowing the user to determine undercut areas, plane surfaces, thickness, volumes, surfaces, weight and to perform dynamic cross-sectional visualization. Flat (2D) drawings are no longer necessary as it is possible to directly add dimensional and geometric measurements, annotations and labels to the 3D model.

PartXplore also allowed the user to send 3D parts and assembly files to others via a standalone application which could be transmitted as an executable file. The recipient can then display and work on the 3D model received.

In 2010 PartXplore was selected by All Nippon Airways (ANA) to distribute and share CAD design information for the maintenance of the Boeing 787 Dreamliner in Japan. PartXplore was available in ten languages, with others in development.

CAD formats supported 
PartXplore reads files of the following types: 
 2D formats: DXF, DWG, WorkNC 2D curves, CATIA V5 2D, UG 2D, Pro/E 2D and HPGL
 3D formats: STL (Stereo-lithography), IGES (Initial Graphics Exchange Specifications - igs, iges), STEP (STandard for the Exchange of Product model data - stp, step), WorkNC 3D (wnc), UGS Parasolid (x_t, xmt_txt, x_b), SolidWorks (Parts, assemblies, drawings & sheet metal -sldprt, sldasm, slddrw), PTC Pro/ENGINEER (prt, asm), CATIA V4 (model, exp, user-def),  CATIA V5 (catpart, catproduct, cgr), UGS Unigraphics 3D (prt, asm), CADDS, SolidEdge (prt, asm), ACIS and UNISURF
 NC formats: ISO G-code, WorkNC files.

See also 
 WorkNC
 WorkPLAN

References

External links 
Partxplore website

Computer-aided design software